The Whanganui Journey is a river journey along the Whanganui River in the North Island of New Zealand travelling by canoe or kayak. The route, starting at Taumarunui and finishing at Pipiriki, is 145 km long and usually takes 5 days to complete. The route is managed by New Zealand's Department of Conservation under its Great Walks programme, and much of the route travels through land which is part of the Whanganui National Park.

Route description
The route is broken into sections which are stretches of river between campsites or huts.
 Taumarunui to Ohinepane : 21.5 km
 Ohinepane to Poukaria : 14 km
 Poukaria to Maharanui : 17.5 km
 Maharanui to Whakahoro : 5 km
 Whakahoro to Mangapapa : 10 km
 Mangapapa to Ohauora : 15 km
 Ohauora to John Coull Hut : 12.5 km
 John Coull Hut to Mangawaiiti : 9.5 km
 Mangawaiiti to Mangapurua, including the Bridge to Nowhere : 9 km
 Mangapurua to Tieke : 10.5 km
 Tieke to Ngaporo : 12 km
 Ngaporo to Pipiriki : 9.5 km

During normal weather conditions the rapids on the river will not exceed grade II. As a result, there are several tour operators that offer a variety of trip combinations covering all, or part of the route.

Although the Great Walk route ends at Pipiriki, the river is navigable for a further 89 km and some canoeists continue to exit at the main bridge in Whanganui, which takes a further two days. Because the river is tidal closer to Whanganui, canoeists doing so need to ensure they leave Hipango Park on an outgoing tide.

Accommodation

Accommodation on the route is in a combination of huts and campsites, which must be booked. River users must purchased a Facilities User Pass (FUP) if travelling on the river between 1 October and 30 April. It is cheaper to purchase the FUP before you go on the river. They are available from the various operators, DOC in Whanganui, or from local Visitor Information Centres. There are different rates for different age groups, and for jetboaters.  Most tour operators/canoe hire places will organize camp sites when you book with them and supply all safety equipment, a map, and transport to/from either end.

External links
Department of Conservation information on The Whanganui Journey
Department of Conservation information on Whanganui National Park

References
New Zealand Recreational Canoeing Association Guide to the Whanganui River (16th Edition, November 2005)

Protected areas of Manawatū-Whanganui
Whanganui River